The 1967 World Figure Skating Championships were held on an open-air ice rink in Vienna, Austria from February 28 to March 4. At the event, sanctioned by the International Skating Union, medals were awarded in men's singles, ladies' singles, pair skating, and ice dance.

This competition was the final time a major skating event was held in an outdoor rink.

Results

Men

Judges:
 Franz Wojtanowski 
 Donald H. Gilchrist 
 Milan Duchón 
 Néri Valdes 
 Carla Listing 
 János Zsigmondy 
 Pál Jaross 
 Kinuko Ueno 
 Jane Vaughn Sullivan

Ladies

Judges:
 Donald B. Cruikshank 
 Gerhardt Bubnik 
 M. Georgelin 
 Walburga Grimm 
 Pamela Davis 
 Éva György 
 Sonia Bianchetti 
 Karl Enderlin 
 M. L. Wright

Pairs

Judges:
 Hans Meixner 
 Donald H. Gilchrist 
 Miroslav Kutina 
 Carla Listing 
 Wilhelm Kahle 
 Maria Zuchowicz 
 Karl Enderlin 
 Jane Vaughn Sullivan 
 Tatiana Tolmacheva

Ice dance

Judges:
 Hans Kutschera 
 Frances Gunn 
 Milan Duchón 
 Lysiane Lauret 
 Hermann Wollersen 
 Robert S. Hudson 
 M. L. Wright

References

Sources
 Result list provided by the ISU

World Figure Skating Championships
World Figure Skating Championships
1967 World Figure Skating Championships
International figure skating competitions hosted by Austria
Sports competitions in Vienna
1960s in Vienna
February 1967 sports events in Europe
March 1967 sports events in Europe